The men's 4 x 400 metres relay event at the 2007 Asian Athletics Championships was held in Amman, Jordan on July 29.

Results

References

Final results

2007 Asian Athletics Championships
Relays at the Asian Athletics Championships